Beguiled or The Beguiled can refer to:

 To be subject to deception
 To be subject to charisma
 The Beguiled, a 1966 novel about the American civil war by Thomas P. Cullinan
 The Beguiled (1971 film), a film adaptation
 The Beguiled (2017 film), a film adaptation